Tenmile Wash is an ephemeral wash and watercourse about  long in the northern Sonoran Desert of south-central Arizona. It forms the eastern drainage of a two drainage system of dry washes into the Gila River Valley; both flow northwesterly, and the western drainage is the San Cristobal Wash Drainage of approximately the same length.

Description
Tenmile Wash begins east of Ajo, Arizona. The Little Ajo and Growler Mountains are west; a series of mountains form the eastern perimeter, and especially the Pozo Redondo Mountains in the southeast. At this point a water divide occurs with the drainage south actually turning back northwest as part of the San Cristobal drainage through the Growler Valley (and is the north end of the Valley of the Ajo).

East and north of Ajo, Tenmile Wash flows northwest through the Childs Valley, on its eastern edge, as the west side of the Childs is drained by the Daniels Wash, again flowing into the San Cristobal drainage to the west.

At the downstream north end, Tenmile Wash traverses the western Sentinel Plain and enters the Park Valley through the  Canyon Diablo; the watercourse then forms its own watercourse flowing southwestwards paralleling the Gila River to the north.

Midway Wash is the eastern portion of the Tenmile Wash drainage; it also drains northwesterly into regions of the southern and central Sentinel Plain.

Access
The southern region is accessed easily in the Ajo region on State Route 85; dirt roads also exit west from the north-south State Route 85 route, to access other parts of Tenmile Wash.

See also
 List of rivers of Arizona

External links 
 Tenmile Wash Watershed Map
 San Cristobal Wash Watershed Map
 Lower Gila – Painted Rock Reservoir Watershed Map – the upstream watershed: Painted Rock Reservoir
 Lower Gila Watershed Map – the downstream watershed (entering the Colorado River)

Washes of Arizona
Rivers of Pima County, Arizona
Rivers of Yuma County, Arizona
Tributaries of the Gila River